Senator Crawford may refer to:

Members of the United States Senate
Coe I. Crawford (1858–1944), U.S. Senator from South Dakota from 1909 to 1915
William H. Crawford (1772–1834), U.S. Senator from Georgia from 1807 to 1813

United States state senate members
Bob Crawford (Florida politician), Florida State Senate
James J. Crawford (1871–1954), New York State Senate
Joel Crawford (politician) (1783–1858), Georgia State Senate
John L. Crawford (died 1902), Florida State Senate
Sue Crawford (born 1967), Nebraska State Senate
Victor Crawford (1932–1996), Maryland State Senate
William Crawford (judge) (1784–1849), Alabama State Senate

See also
Robert Sharman-Crawford (1853–1934), Northern Irish Senator from 1921 to 1934